Ensemble is a group-composition project devised by Karlheinz Stockhausen for the 1967 Darmstädter Ferienkurse. Twelve composers and twelve instrumentalists participated, and the resulting performance lasted four hours. It is not assigned a work number in Stockhausen's catalogue of works.

History
For the 1967 Darmstädter Ferienkurse Stockhausen organised a composition seminar during the two-week period preceding the courses proper, in which twelve composers from various countries each developed a composition which was a dialogue to be performed by an instrumentalist and the composer, using either a previously prepared tape of sound materials or a short-wave receiver. This was the first time in the history of the Darmstadt Courses that actual composing was formally undertaken within the framework of the courses themselves.

The participating composers were paired with the instrumentalists (eleven members of the Ensemble Hudba Dneska (Bratislava), directed by Ladislav Kupkovič, plus Aloys Kontarsky:

They were supplemented at the mixing consoles by:
 
 Alden Jenks
 David C. Johnson
 Petr Kotik

This second project would be titled Musik für ein Haus.

Analysis
The twelve constituent composer/performer duos are scattered throughout the hall, and are coordinated according to a "process plan" composed by Stockhausen, who also composed eight inserts leading to occasional points of synchronisation. Each group is picked up on microphones and fed to four mixing consoles, controlled by additional musicians whose task is to expand certain details of sound and send them wandering around the hall over eight loudspeakers. The audience members are also free to move about the hall and choose their own acoustical perspectives.

The music was therefore pluralistic, soloistic, and collective all at the same time. The inserts composed by Stockhausen were intended to unify all of the performers by verticalizing the musical events, harmonically and rhythmically. The performance was arranged to begin before the audience began to arrive, and ended with each composer-instrumentalist pair leaving the gymnasium one after another, still playing in the back of cars as they drove away, to meet again at 2:00am twenty miles away.

Discography
 Karlheinz Stockhausen: Ensemble. Music of 12 performing composers, members of the Ensemble Hudba Dneska, and Aloys Kontarsky, Hammond organ. Recording of the dress rehearsal, rehearsal and performance, 28 and 29 August 1967, each four hours in duration, edited and reduced to about 62 minutes by Mesías Maiguashca at the Studio für elektronische Musik im WDR, 26 August – 22 September 1971. LP recording, 1 disc: 12 in., 33⅓ rpm, stereo. Studio-Reihe neuer Musik. Wergo WER 60065 Mainz: Wergo 1971.

References

Sources

 
 
 
 Hommel, Friedrich. 1967. "Ersprießliches und Mißliches in Darmstadt: Die 22. Internationalen Ferienkurse für Neue Musik". Frankfurter Allgemeine Zeitung 1967 no. 209 (9 September): 12.

Further reading
 Huber, Nicolaus A. 1967. "Karlheinz Stockhausens Ensemble: Ein Bericht".  Reprinted in Huber, Durchleuchtungen: Texte zur Musik 1964–1999, edited by Josef Häusler, 1–5. Wiesbaden: Breitkopf & Härtel. .
 Maconie, Robin. 2005. Other Planets: The Music of Karlheinz Stockhausen. Lanham, Maryland, Toronto, Oxford: The Scarecrow Press. .
 Stockhausen, Karlheinz. 1971b. "Kriterien". Texte zur Musik 3 (1963–1970), edited by Dieter Schnebel, 222–229. DuMont Dokumente. Cologne: Verlag M. DuMont Schauberg.
 Wörner, Karl H. 1973. Stockhausen: Life and Work, introduced, translated, and edited by Bill Hopkins. London: Faber and Faber; Berkeley and Los Angeles: University of California Press.

1967 compositions
Collaborations in classical music
Compositions by Karlheinz Stockhausen
Process music pieces
Spatial music